The 85th Regiment of Foot (Royal Volunteers) was a short-lived British Army regiment during the Seven Years' War. It was recruited at Shrewsbury in 1759 as the first full regiment of light infantry in the British Army and originally intended for service in the North American campaign.

It instead formed part of the force that captured and occupied the island of Belle Ile off the French coast,  before being sent to Portugal in 1762. The regiment returned home to be disbanded the following year after the Treaty of Paris (1763) as part of a general demobilisation. 

The Colonel of the Regiment throughout its life was Colonel John Craufurd, who was afterwards made Colonel of the Buffs (Royal East Kent Regiment).

References

Infantry regiments of the British Army
Military units and formations established in 1759
Military units and formations disestablished in 1763
1759 establishments in England